Karla K. Gower (born 1957) is an American public relations professor, focusing in journalism and media and strategic communication, currently the Behringer Distinguished Professor in the Advertising and Public Relations at University of Alabama.
Since 2008, she has been the director of The Plank Center for Leadership in Public Relations.

Biography
Gower worked as an attorney in Canada for 8 years before moving to the United States. Her career includes work in public relations for Blue Cross and Blue Shield of Arizona, internal communications and media relations for GateWay Community College, and writing for the Office of University Development at the University of North Carolina, Chapel Hill.

She holds law and bachelor degrees from the University of Western Ontario, Canada, a master's in mass communication from Arizona State University, and a doctorate in mass communication from the University of North Carolina at Chapel Hill.

Works
Liberty and Authority in Free Expression Law: The United States and Canada (2002)
PR and the Press: The Troubled Embrace (2007)

The Opinions of Mankind: Racial Issues, Press and Propaganda in the Cold War (2010) (co-author)

References

External links

University of Alabama faculty
American public relations people
University of North Carolina alumni
Arizona State University alumni
University of Western Ontario alumni
Living people
1957 births
Place of birth missing (living people)